Simon David O'Connor  (born 25 February 1976) is a New Zealand politician and a member of the New Zealand House of Representatives. He is a member of the National Party. He has represented the Tāmaki electorate since 2011. He is a member of the Foreign Affairs, Defence, and Trade committee.

Early life
O'Connor was raised in Whangarei, the eldest of three children, where he attended St Mary's Primary School and Pompallier College. He was a keen fencer and was president of the Auckland University Fencing Club.

O'Connor completed training to be a Catholic priest, which involved working on the island of Taveuni in Fiji for two years at a vocational training centre, prison chaplaincy at Mount Eden Prison, military chaplaincy at Waiouru Army Base, and spending time with people in hospitals and hospices. He did not seek ordination, deciding instead to study and pursue a career in politics.

O'Connor graduated from the University of Auckland with a Bachelor of Arts in Geography and Political Studies (his Political Studies Honours dissertation looked at the works of Rene Girard), a Bachelor of Theology, and a Master of Arts with First Class Honours (Political Studies). He has also worked as a contracts manager for Southern Cross Insurance.

O'Connor was the chairperson of Monarchy New Zealand between 2010 and 2012 and remains a board member.

Political career

In Government, 2011–2017
O'Connor has been involved in the National Party since 2005. He was deputy chair of the party's Northern Region before seeking the National nomination for the Maungakiekie electorate in 2008. He lost the selection contest to Sam Lotu-Iiga, who went on to win the seat, but O'Connor was appointed as a list candidate for the 2008 general election. He was selected as the party's candidate in the  electorate following the withdrawal of sitting MP Allan Peachey shortly before the 2011 election and was elected to Parliament.

From October 2014 to August 2017 he was chair of the Health Select Committee, where he chaired the then-largest enquiry in New Zealand Parliament's history, into euthanasia. He has also served as Deputy Chairperson of the Finance and Expenditure Committee and spokesperson for corrections.

In conscience votes, in 2012 O'Connor opposed raising the drinking age from 18, and in 2013 opposed the Marriage (Definition of Marriage) Amendment Bill, a bill allowing same-sex couples to marry in New Zealand. In 2015 he opposed a bill which would ban street prostitution, in 2016 supported a bill to allow Easter Sunday trading, and in 2017 opposed the End of Life Choice Bill.

In August 2015, O'Connor uploaded a Facebook video in which he looked at the 40 alternative flag designs shortlisted by the Flag Consideration Panel and responded with "no" to each flag until he turned to the current flag and said "yes".

On 10 September 2017, two weeks before the general election and on World Suicide Prevention Day, O'Connor posted on Facebook that it was "strange" how Labour leader Jacinda Ardern was "concerned about youth suicide" but was "happy to encourage the suicide of the elderly, disabled, and sick" by way of her support of the End of Life Choice Bill. The post was condemned by some politicians and social media.

In opposition, 2017–present
During the 2017 general election in September, O'Connor was re-elected in the Tāmaki electorate, defeating Labour candidate Sam McDonald by 15,042 votes.

In February 2018, as part of his responsibilities as Foreign Affairs, Defence, and Trade Committee Chair, he travelled to Iraq and Afghanistan to visit New Zealand troops.

In March 2020, he attracted attention for a statement he made as part of his speech in opposition to the third reading of the Abortion Legislation Bill, where he repeated a quotation from the Bible in Latin: "Mihi vindicta: ego retribuam, dicit Dominus," which is translated as "Vengeance is mine; I will repay, saith the Lord.” The contrast between this and the criticisms of the bill's opponents in the speech given in support of it by Amy Adams was noted by journalist Richard Harman as a public expression of deep divisions on the issue between liberals and conservatives within the National Party caucus.

During the 2020 New Zealand general election, O'Connor retained Tāmaki by a margin of 8,068 votes.

In response to the demotion of Simon Bridges by National leader Judith Collins on 24 November 2021, O'Connor resigned his portfolios, saying he no longer wanted to work with Collins.

O'Connor was one of only eight MPs to vote against the Conversion Practices Prohibition Legislation Act 2022. In early February, O'Connor spoke against the Bill during its second reading, claiming during his speech that banning conversion therapy would erase gay and lesbian individuals, who would then be encouraged to live as transgender people. He also claimed that the Bill violated free speech by focusing on "hurt feelings." O'Connor's remarks were described as "transphobic and cringeworthy" by LGBT activist Shaneel Lal, who contended that he underestimated the ability of queer children to have dialogue with their parents. Similar sentiments were echoed by Auckland Councillor Richard Hills and Labour MP Marja Lubeck. The Bill passed its third and final reading on 15 February 2022, becoming law.

In late June 2022, O'Connor published a Facebook post welcoming the United States Supreme Court's overtuning of Roe v. Wade. He subsequently removed the post after National Party leader Christopher Luxon stated that the post was "causing distress" and did not represent the party's position on abortion. In response to the controversy around O'Connor's post, several Tāmaki residents called for O'Connor to resign as their Member of Parliament. By contrast, former National MP Alfred Ngaro defended O'Connor's freedom of expression and accused Luxon of silencing National MPs. On 28 June, O'Connor apologised to his National Party colleagues for the hurt and distress that his Facebook post had caused. He denied that he had been "gagged" by Luxon and explained that he had offered to taken down the post because it had attracted " toxic and unhealthy" comments.

Member of IPAC
Since 2020, O'Connor has been a co-chair of the Inter-Parliamentary Alliance on China (IPAC), an international group of legislators working towards reform on how democratic countries approach China, and specifically, the Chinese Communist Party. In December 2020, he and fellow IPAC member Louisa Wall urged New Zealand to speak out against China's alleged "coercive diplomacy" and support Australia in the face of diplomatic and economic pressure from China.

In August 2022, O'Connor, fellow IPAC member Labour MP Ingrid Leary, and other members from Australia, India and Japan launched a new local Indo-Pacific chapter to focus on increased Chinese militarisation in that region.

Reselection challenge
On 30 September 2022, New Zealand political website politik reveled that three unknown people had launched campaigns to replace O'Connor as the National party's Tāmaki candidate at the 2023 New Zealand general election. The local National party branch is set to make a decision in October 2022. On 21 October, O'Connor's challengers were identified as lawyer Andrew Grant and restaurant proprietor Sang Cho. Grant had publicly opposed "tough on crime" rhetoric.

Personal life
On 10 December 2016, he married Rachel Trimble, the sister of fellow National MP Simon Bridges, and has five step children.

References

External links

Profile at the New Zealand Parliament website
 On Point podcast

1976 births
Living people
New Zealand National Party MPs
New Zealand Roman Catholics
New Zealand MPs for Auckland electorates
Unsuccessful candidates in the 2008 New Zealand general election
New Zealand monarchists
Members of the New Zealand House of Representatives
21st-century New Zealand politicians
Candidates in the 2017 New Zealand general election